James Daniel Parnell (October 9, 1923 – December 27, 1961) was an American film and television actor.

Parnell was born in Saint Paul, Minnesota, the son of Effie and Emory Parnell, a vaudeville performer. He had a brother, Charles Parnell. Parnell began his acting career in 1950 with an uncredited role in the film California Passage. He then appeared in the films Apache Drums and G.I. Jane. Parnell was also a cast member of the New York production of the musical Oklahoma! for five years. Parnell appeared in over 100 films and television programs, including an appearance as Marv Tremain in the 1956 film Star in the Dust. He also performed on stage plays.

Parnell appeared in numerous films, such as, Yukon Gold (1952); War Paint (1953); The Yellow Mountain (1954); Crime Against Joe (1956); The Delicate Delinquent (1957); Hell's Five Hours (1958); The Walking Target (1960) and Gun Fight (1961). His last film credit was for the 1962 film Incident in an Alley. He also appeared in the television programs, Bonanza, The Life and Legend of Wyatt Earp, 77 Sunset Strip, Tombstone Territory, Mr. Lucky, The Real McCoys, 
Leave It To Beaver,
Have Gun, Will Travel and Bat Masterson.

Parnell died in December 1961 in North Hollywood, California, at the age of 38.

References

External links 

Rotten Tomatoes profile

1923 births
1961 deaths
People from Saint Paul, Minnesota
Male actors from Saint Paul, Minnesota
American male film actors
American male stage actors
American male television actors
20th-century American male actors